The National Republican Club of Capitol Hill, commonly known as the Capitol Hill Club, is a private club for Republicans in Washington, D.C.

History
It was established in 1951 by former New Jersey Congressman James C. Auchincloss, who with 100 other members formed the club, which is now "one of the most popular gathering spots in Washington for lawmakers, government officials and other members of the political establishment."

The club is a distinct and separate organization from the Republican National Committee and has no official affiliation to the committee or the party.

The Capitol Hill Club is located at 300 First St SE on Capitol Hill in southeastern Washington 20003, less than two blocks from the United States Capitol and across from the Capitol South Metro station. It is the former home of John S. McCain Jr. and Roberta McCain.

See also
 List of American gentlemen's clubs

References

External links

1951 establishments in Washington, D.C.
Clubs and societies in the United States
Organizations based in Washington, D.C.
Republican Party (United States) organizations
Gentlemen's clubs in the United States